Rustam Djangabaev (born 25 August 1993) is an Uzbekistani heavyweight weightlifter. He won a gold medal at the 2017 Asian Championships and a bronze at the 2018 Asian Games. He placed sixth at the 2016 Olympics.

Djangabaev took up weightlifting in 2011. He has a degree in physical education from the Nukus State Pedagogical Institute.

In 2019 he tested positive for Growth Hormone and was banned until 2023 by the International Weightlifting Federation.

Major results

References

External links

1993 births
Living people
Uzbekistani male weightlifters
Asian Games bronze medalists for Uzbekistan
Asian Games medalists in weightlifting
Doping cases in weightlifting
Medalists at the 2018 Asian Games
Olympic weightlifters of Uzbekistan
Weightlifters at the 2016 Summer Olympics
Weightlifters at the 2018 Asian Games
World Weightlifting Championships medalists